This timeline of hadrosaur research is a chronological listing of events in the history of paleontology focused on the hadrosauroids, a group of herbivorous ornithopod dinosaurs popularly known as the duck-billed dinosaurs. Scientific research on hadrosaurs began in the 1850s, when Joseph Leidy described the genera Thespesius and Trachodon based on scrappy fossils discovered in the western United States. Just two years later he published a description of the much better-preserved remains of an animal from New Jersey that he named Hadrosaurus.

The early 20th century saw such a boom in hadrosaur discoveries and research that paleontologists' knowledge of these dinosaurs "increased by virtually an order of magnitude" according to a 2004 review by Horner, Weishampel, and Forster. This period is known as the great North American Dinosaur rush because of the research and excavation efforts of paleontologists like Brown, Gilmore, Lambe, Parks, and the Sternbergs. Major discoveries included the variety of cranial ornamentation among hadrosaurs as scientist came to characterize uncrested, solid crested, and hollow crested species. Notable new taxa included  Saurolophus, Corythosaurus, Edmontosaurus, and Lambeosaurus. In 1942 Richard Swann Lull and Wright published what Horner, Weishampel, and Forster characterized as the "first important synthesis of hadrosaurid anatomy and phylogeny".

More recent discoveries include gigantic hadrosaurs like Shantungosaurus giganteus from China. At 15 meters in length and nearly 16 metric tons in weight it is the largest known hadrosaur and is known from a nearly complete skeleton.

Hadrosaur research has continued to remain active even into the new millennium. In 2000, Horner and others found that hatchling Maiasaura grew to adult body sizes at a rate more like a mammal's than a reptile. That same year, Case and others reported the discovery of hadrosaur bones in Vega Island, Antarctica. After decades of such dedicated research, hadrosaurs have become one of the best understood group of dinosaurs.

19th century

1850s 

1856
 Joseph Leidy described the new genus and species Thespesius occidentalis. He also described the new genus and species Trachodon mirabilis. Although both species were based on poorly preserved material, this paper was the first to be published on hadrosaurid dinosaurs.

1858
 Leidy described the new genus and species Hadrosaurus foulkii. He thought it was an amphibious animal.

1860s 

1868
 Leidy collaborated with artist Benjamin Waterhouse Hawkins to mount Hadrosaurus foulkii for the Academy of Natural Sciences of Philadelphia. This became both the first mounted dinosaur skeleton ever mounted for public display and also one of the most popular exhibits in the history of the academy. Estimates have the Hadrosaurus exhibit as increasing the number of visitors by up to 50%.

1869
 Edward Drinker Cope described the new genus and species Hypsibema crassicauda.
 Cope named the Hadrosauridae. He observed that the primary distinguishing trait of the group was their dental battery.
 Cope described the new genus and species Ornithotarsus immanis.

1870s 
1870
 Othniel Charles Marsh described the new species Hadrosaurus minor.

1871
 Cope described the new species Hadrosaurus cavatus.

1872
 Marsh described the new species Hadrosaurus agilis.

1874
 Cope described the new species Agathaumas milo. He also described the new genus and species Cionodon arctatus.

1875
 Cope described the new species Cionodon stenopsis.

1876
 Cope described the new genus and species Diclonius calamarius. He also described the new species Diclonius pentagonus, Diclonius perangulatus, and Dysganus encaustus.

1880s 

1883
 Harry Govier Seeley described the new genus and species Orthomerus dolloi.
 Cope still regarded hadrosaurs as amphibious.

1888
 Richard Lydekker described the new species Trachodon cantabrigiensis.

1889

 Marsh described the new species Hadrosaurus breviceps. He also described the new species Hadrosaurus paucidens.
 Cope described the new genus and species Pteropelyx grallipes.

1890s 
1890
 Marsh erected the new genus Claosaurus to house the species Hadrosaurus agilis. He also described the new species Trachodon longiceps.

1892
 Marsh described the new species Claosaurus annectens.
 Cope described the new genus and species Claorhynchus trihedrus.
 Newton described the new species Iguanodon hilli.

20th century

1900s 
1900
 Franz Nopcsa described the new genus and species Limnosaurus transsylvanicus.

1902
 Lawrence Lambe described the new genus and species Trachodon altidens; in the same volume, he suggested the name Didanodon for the same species, but the validity of this name has been questioned. He also described the new species Trachodon marginatus. He also described the new species Trachodon selwyni.

1903
 Nopcsa erected the new genus Telmatosaurus to house the species Limnosaurus transsylvanicus, as the latter genus name was preoccupied .
 George Wieland described the new species Claosaurus affinis.

1910 

1910
 Barnum Brown described the new genus Hecatasaurus. He also described the new genus and species Kritosaurus navajovius.

1912
 Brown described the new genus and species Saurolophus osborni.

1913
 Brown described the new genus and species Hypacrosaurus altispinus.
 Cutler excavated a juvenile Gryposaurus now catalogued by the Canadian Museum of Nature as CMN 8784. The site of the excavation has since been designated "quarry 252".
 Winter: Cutler partly prepared the young Gryposaurus specimen, possibly in Calgary while working on dinosaurs for Euston Sisely.

1914
 Brown described the new genus and species Corythosaurus casuarius.
 Lambe described the new genus and species Gryposaurus notabilis.

1915
 Charles H. Sternberg's crew excavated a Corythosaurus from quarry 243 in Dinosaur Provincial Park, Alberta, Canada. The specimen would later be displayed at the Calgary Zoo.
 Matthew observed that fossils of hadrosaur eggs and hatchlings were absent in coastal areas and suggested that hadrosaurs may have preferred nesting grounds further inland. He believed that these inland nesting grounds were actually where hadrosaurs first evolved and therefore to breed, hadrosaurs retraced their ancestors route back to their place of origin. After hatching, the young hadrosaurs would spend some time inland maturing before migrating out to more coastal areas.

1916
 Brown described the new genus and species Prosaurolophus maximus.

1917
 Lambe described the new genus and species Edmontosaurus regalis.
 Lambe described the new genus and species Cheneosaurus tolmanensis.

1918

 Lambe named the Hadrosaurinae.

1920s 

1920
 Matthew described the new genus Procheneosaurus.
 Parks described the new species Kritosaurus incurvimanus.

1922
 William Parks described the new genus and species Parasaurolophus walkeri.
 Krausel reported fossil gut contents from an Edmontosaurus annectens mummy. He described the material as including conifer needles and branches, deciduous foliage, and possible small seeds or fruit.
 Abel argued that the plant material Krausel argues was the fossilized remains of the gut contents of an Edmontosaurus annectens was actually deposited by flowing water.

1923
 Charles Whitney Gilmore described the new species Corythosaurus excavatus.
 Parks described the new species Corythosaurus intermedius. He also described the new genus and species Lambeosaurus lambei.

1924
 Gilmore described the new species Thespesius edmontonensis.

1925
 Riabinin described the new species Trachodon amurensis.

1926
 Sternberg described the new species Thespesius saskatchewanensis.

1929
 Wiman described the new genus and species Tanius sinensis.

1930s 

1930
 Riabinin described the new species Saurolophus kryschtofovici.
 Riabinin erected the new genus Mandschurosaurus to house the species Trachodon amurensis.

1931
 Parks described the new genus and species Tetragonosaurus erectofrons. He also described the new species Tetragonosaurus praeceps.
 Wiman described the new species Parasaurolophus tubicen.
 Riabinin described the new genus and species Cionodon kysylkumensis.

1933
 Gilmore described the new genus and species Bactrosaurus johnsoni. He also described the new species Mandschurosaurus mongoliensis.
 Parks described the new species Corythosaurus bicristatus and C. brevicristatus.

1935
 Sternberg described the new species Tetragonosaurus cranibrevis. He also described the new species Lambeosaurus clavinitialis and L. magnicristatus.
 Parks described the new species Corythosaurus frontalis.

1936
 Takumi Nagao described the new genus and species Nipponosaurus sachalinensis.

1939
 Riabinin described the new genus and species Jaxartosaurus aralensis. He also described the new species Bactrosaurus prynadai.

1940s 

1942
 Richard Swann Lull and Wright described the new genus Anatosaurus for Claosaurus annectens. They also name the new species Anatosaurus copei.

1943
 Hoffet described the new species Mandschurosaurus laosensis.

1945
 Riabinin described the new species Orthomerus weberi.
 Gilmore and Stewart described the new genus and species Neosaurus missouriensis.
 Gilmore erected the new genus Parrosaurus to house the species Neosaurus missouriensis, as the name Neosaurus was occupied.

1946
 Young described the new genus and species Sanpasaurus yaoi.
 Colbert redescribed the species Hadrosaurus minor.

1950s 

1952
 Rozhdestvensky described the new species Saurolophus angustirostris.

1953
 Sternberg described the new genus and species Brachylophosaurus canadensis.

1958
 Young described the new species Tanius chingkankouensis.
 Young described the new genus and species Tsintaosaurus spinorhinus.

1960s 

1960
 Langston described the new genus and species Lophorhothon atopus.

1961
 Ostrom described the new species Parasaurolophus cyrtocristatus.

1964
 Ostrom supported Krausel's 1922 claim that fossil plant material found associated with an Edmontosaurus annectens mummy was actually its gut contents.

1967
Russel and Chamney studied distribution of hadrosaur in Maastrichtian North America. The concluded that Edmontosaurus regalis lived near the coasts while Hypacrosaurus altispinus and Saurolophus osborni lived slightly more inland.

1968
 Rozhdeventsky described the new genus and species Aralosaurus tubiferous. He also described the new species Procheneosaurus convincens.

1970s 
1970
 Galton argued that the anatomy of the hadrosaur pelvis was more consistent with a horizontal posture like that seen in modern flightless birds than with the "kangaroo" posture they were often reconstructed in.

1971
 Dodson argued that hadrosaurs may not have fed exclusively on land.

1973
 Hu described the new genus and species Shantungosaurus giganteus.

1975

 Dodson found evidence for sexual and ontogenetic dimorphism in two different kinds of lambeosaurine using morphometrics.

1976
 Zhen described the new species Tanius laiyengensis.

1979
 Brett-Surman erected the new genus Gilmoreosaurus to house the species Mandschurosaurus mongoliensis. He also described the new genus and species Secernosaurus koerneri.
 Brett-Surman was unable to determine where hadrosaurs first evolved.
 Horner and Makela described the new genus and species Maiasaura peeblesorum. They argued that hadrosaurs cared for their young for an extended period after hatching.
 Horner argued that hadrosaur fossils found in marine deposited were simply the preserved remains of individuals that had washed out to sea from a terrestrial place of origin.
 Dong described the new genus and species Microhadrosaurus nanshiungensis.

1980s 

1980
  Hotton argued that some hadrosaurs may have migrated seasonally in a north–south direction.

1981
 Teresa Maryańska and Osmolska described the new genus and species Barsboldia sicinskii.
 Morris described the new species Lambeosaurus laticaudus.

1982
 Suslov and Shilin described the new genus and species Arstanosaurus akkurganensis.
 Carpenter disputed the idea that hadrosaurs only nested in upland environments, instead arguing that fossil hadrosaur eggs and hatchlings were only absent from coastal deposits because the chemistry of the ancient soils were simply too acidic to preserve them.
 Thulborn argued that hadrosaurs may have been able to run at speeds of up to 14–20 km/hr for sustained periods.

1983
 Horner observed that Maiasaura peeblesorum is only known to have lived in the upper regions of contemporary coastal plains.
 Weishampel described hadrosaur chewing and cranial kinetics.
 Weishampel and Weishampel reported the presence of hadrosaur remains on the Antarctic Peninsula.

1984
 Wu described the new genus and species Jaxartosaurus fuyuensis.
 Milner and Norman argued that hadrosaurs evolved in Asia.
 Horner observed that fossil eggs and hadrosaur hatchlings were common in sediments deposited in the upper regions of what were once coastal plains.
 Weishampel described hadrosaur chewing and cranial kinetics.
 Norman described hadrosaur chewing and cranial kinetics.
 Weishampel argued that hadrosaurs fed mainly on vegetation of 2 m in height or less but had a maximum browsing height of 4 m.
 Bonaparte and others described the new species Kritosaurus australis.

1985
 Norman and Weishampel described hadrosaur chewing and cranial kinetics.

1987
 Horner observed that fossil eggs and hadrosaur hatchlings were common in sediments deposited in the upper regions of what were once coastal plains.
Farlow argued that their highly developed chewing abilities and large gut volumes meant hadrosaurs werehighly adapted to feeding on nutrient poor, fibrous vegetation.

1988
 Horner described the new species Brachylophosaurus goodwini.

1990s 
1990
 Brett-Surman described the new genus Anatotitan for Anatosaurus copei.
 Horner argued that the hadrosaurids were not a natural group, and instead that the two major groups of hadrosaurs, the generally uncrested hadrosaurines and the crested lambeosaurs had separate origins within the Iguanodontia. Horner thought that the uncrested hadrosaurs were descended from a relative of Iguanodon, while the crested lambeosaurs were descended from a relative of Ouranosaurus. However, this proposal would find no support in any subsequent research publication.
 Weishampel and Horner found the Hadrosauridae to be a natural group after all. They also found cladistic support for the traditional division of Hadrosauridae into the subfamilies Hadrosaurinae and Lambeosaurinae.
 Weishampel reported the presence of hadrosaurs on the Antarctic peninsula.

1991
 Bolotsky and Kurzanov described the new genus and species Amurosaurus riabinini.

1992

 Horner described the new species Gryposaurus latidens. He also described the new species Prosaurolophus blackfeetensis.

1993
 Hunt and Lucas described the new genus and species Anasazisaurus horneri. They also described the new genus and species Naashoibitosaurus ostromi.
 Weishampel, Norman, and Griogescu named the clade Euhadrosauria.
 Weishampel and others proposed a node-based definition for the Hadrosauridae: the descendants of the most recent common ancestor shared by Telmatosaurus and Parasaurolophus. They found the hadrosaurs to be a natural group, contrary to Horner's 1990 arguments that the hadrosaur subfamilies were descended from different kinds of iguanodont. They also found cladistic support for the traditional division of Hadrosauridae into the subfamilies Hadrosaurinae and Lambeosaurinae.
 Clouse and Horner reported the presence of hadrosaur egg, embryo and hatchling fossils from the Judith River Formation of Montana. Since these sediments were deposited in a low-lying coastal plain, the researchers' discovery contradicted previous hypotheses that hadrosaurs either didn't nest in lowland areas or that local ancient soil was too acidic to preserve them.

1994
 Horner and Currie described the new species Hypacrosaurus stebingeri.

1996
 Chin and Gill described Maiasaura peeblesorum coprolites from an ancient nesting ground of that species. The coprolites were "blocky", irregularly-shaped masses that preserved plant fragments. The researchers identified it as feces because the masses contained fossilized dung beetle burrows. The plant material suggested a diet consisting mainly of conifer stems.

1997
 Forster found the hadrosaurs to be a natural group, contrary to Horner's 1990 arguments that the hadrosaur subfamilies were descended from different kinds of iguanodont. They also found cladistic support for the traditional division of Hadrosauridae into the subfamilies Hadrosaurinae and Lambeosaurinae. She preferred to define the Hadrosauridae as the most recent common ancestor of the hadrosaurines and lambeosaurines and all of its descendants. Unlike the definition used by Weishampel and others in 1993, this definition excluded Telmatosaurus.

1999
 Sereno found the hadrosaurs to be a natural group, contrary to Horner's 1990 arguments that the hadrosaur subfamilies were descended from different kinds of iguanodont.

21st century

2000s 
2000
 Godefroit, Zan, and Jin described the new genus and species Charonosaurus jiayinensis.
 Case and others reported the presence of hadrosaurs on the Antarctica peninsula. The remains studied were found on Vega Island and represent the southernmost known hadrosaur fossils. When the animals were still alive, this site was probably at a latitude of about 65 degrees South.
 Horner and others studied the histology of Maiasaura peeblesorum bones. They found that Maiasaura only took 8–10 years to reach adult body size. A  adult Maiasaura could have an adult body mass of over  despite hatching at a length of about half a meter and with a body mass of less than a kilogram. This disparity implies a rate or growth similar to those found in modern mammals.

2001
 Horner and others published additional research on the histology of Maiasaura peeblesorum bones.

2003
 You and others described the new genus and species Equijubus normani.
 Kobayashi and Azuma described the new genus and species Fukuisaurus tetoriensis.
 Godefroit, Bolotsky, and Alifanov described the new genus and species Olorotitan arharensis.

2004
 Bolotsky and Godefroit described the new genus and species Kerberosaurus manakini.

2005
 Godefroit, Li, and Shang described the new genus and species Penelopognathus weishampeli.

2006
 Prieto-Márquez and others described the new genus and species Koutalisaurus kohlerorum.

2007
 Gilpin and others described the new genus and species Cedrorestes crichtoni.

 Mo and others described the new genus and species Nanningosaurus dashiensis.
 Zhao and others described the new genus and species Zhuchengosaurus maximus.

2008
 Godefroit and others described the new genus and species Sahaliyania elunchunorum and the new genus and species Wulagasaurus dongi.

2009
 Wagner and Lehman described the new genus and species Angulomastacator daviesi.
 Pereda-Suberbiola and others described the new genus and species Arenysaurus ardevoli.
 Sues and Averianov described the new genus and species Levnesovia transoxiana.
 Dalla Vecchia described the new genus and species Tethyshadros insularis.

2010s 
2010
 Cruzado-Caballero and others described the new genus and species Blasisaurus canudoi.
 Prieto-Márquez described the new genus and species Glishades ericksoni.
 Juárez Valieri and others described the new genus and species Willinakaqe salitralensis.

2011
 Gates and others described the new genus and species Acristavus gagslarsoni.

2012
 Godefroit and others described the new genus and species Batyrosaurus rozhdestvenskyi.
 Ramírez-Velasco and others described the new genus and species Huehuecanauhtlus tiquichensis.
 Godefroit and others described the new genus and species Kundurosaurus nagornyi.
 Coria, Riga and Casadío described the new genus and species Lapampasaurus cholinoi.
 Prieto-Márquez and Brañas described the new genus and species Latirhinus uitstlani.
 Prieto-Márquez Chiappe, and Joshi described the new genus and species Magnapaulia.

2013
 Prieto-Márquez and others described the new genus and species Canardia garonnensis.
 Phil R. Bell and Kirstin S. Brink described the new genus and species Kazaklambia convincens.
 Prieto-Márquez and Wagner described the new species Saurolophus morrisi.
 Wang and others described the new genus and species Yunganglong datongensis.

2014
 Prieto-Márquez and others described the new genus Augustynolophus.
 Gates and Scheetz described the new genus and species Rhinorex condrupus.
 Xing and others described the new genus and species Zhanghenglong yangchengensis.
 Gates and others described the new genus Adelolophus.
 You, Li, and Dodson described the new genus Gongpoquansaurus.

2015
 Shibata and Azuma described the new genus and species Koshisaurus katsuyama.
 Mori, Druckenmiller and Erickson described the new genus and species Ugrunaaluk kuukpikensis.
 Freedman Fowler, and Horner described the new genus and species Probrachylophosaurus.
 Shibata and others described the new genus and species Sirindhorna khoratensis.

2016
 Xu and others described the new genus and species Datonglong.
 Wang and others described the new genus and species Zuoyunlong.
 Prieto-Marquez, Erickson and Ebersole described the new genus and species Eotrachodon orientalis

2017

 Cruzado-Caballero and Powell described the new genus and species Bonapartesaurus rionegrensis.
 Study of corpolites by Chin, Feldmann & Tashman show hadrosaurs occasionally consumed decaying wood and crustaceans 
2018

 Gates and others described the new genus and species Choyrodon barsboldi.

2019

 Prieto-Márquez and others described the new genus and species Adynomosaurus arcanus.
 Zhang and others described the new genus and species Laiyangosaurus youngi.
 Tsogtbaatar and others described the new genus and species Gobihadros mongoliensis.
 Prieto-Márquez, Wagner, and Lehman described the new genus and species Aquilarhinus palimentus.
 Kobayashi and others described the new genus and species Kamuysaurus japonicus.
 A study on the nature of the fluvial systems of Laramidia during the Late Cretaceous, as indicated by data from vertebrate and invertebrate fossils from the Kaiparowits Formation of southern Utah, and on the behavior of hadrosaurid dinosaurs over these landscapes, will be published by Crystal et al. (2019).
 A study on the osteology and phylogenetic relationships of "Tanius laiyangensis" is published by Zhang et al. (2019).
 A study on the bone histology of tibiae of Maiasaura peeblesorum, focusing on the composition, frequency and cortical extent of localized vascular changes, is published by Woodward (2019).
 Three juvenile specimens of Prosaurolophus maximus, providing new information on the ontogeny of this taxon, are described from the Bearpaw Formation (Alberta, Canada) by Drysdale et al. (2019).
 A study on the impact of bone tissue structure, early diagenetic regimes and other taphonomic variables on the preservation potential of soft tissues in vertebrate fossils, as indicated by data from fossils of Edmontosaurus annectens from the Standing Rock Hadrosaur Site (Maastrichtian Hell Creek Formation, South Dakota), is published by Ullmann, Pandya & Nellermoe (2019), who report the first recovery of osteocytes and vessels from a fossil vertebral centrum and ossified tendons.
 The first definitive lambeosaurine fossil (an isolated skull bone) is described from the Liscomb Bonebed of the Prince Creek Formation (Alaska, United States) by Takasaki et al. (2019).
 Traces preserved on a tail vertebra of a hadrosaurid dinosaur from the Upper Cretaceous Hell Creek Formation (Montana, United States) are described by Peterson & Daus (2019), who interpret their finding as feeding traces produced by a late-stage juvenile Tyrannosaurus rex.

See also 
 History of paleontology
 Timeline of paleontology

Footnotes

References

External links
 

Hadrosaurs
hadrosaur